Frank John Lausche (November 14, 1895 – April 21, 1990) was an American Democratic politician from Ohio. He served as the 47th mayor of Cleveland and the 55th and 57th governor of Ohio, and also served as a United States Senator from Ohio for two terms (1957–1969).

Youth and baseball career
Lausche's family originates from Slovenia. He was born in Cleveland, Ohio, the son of Frances (née Milavec) and Louis Lausche. Lausche attended St. Vitus Grade School grades one to four, St. Francis Grade School in grade five and Madison Grammar School grades six to eight. He then went to Central Institute Preparatory School. He dropped out of school in 1911, when his older brother died, to help support his family. He played baseball locally when not working, and was recruited as a third baseman to the amateur White Motor team, which won a national championship. He was noticed by scouts and reported to the Duluth White Sox in Duluth, Minnesota, of the Class D Northern League in the spring of 1916. He started the season batting .422, but developed trouble hitting curve balls, and was released after 31 games. He signed with a semi-pro team in Virginia, Minnesota. He performed poorly for two weeks before returning to Cleveland, and amateur ball.

During the spring of 1917, Lausche reported to the Class B Lawrence Barristers, Lawrence, Massachusetts, of the Eastern League. He started well, but was released after 27 games. He enlisted in the United States Army that summer, and reported to Camp Gordon, near Atlanta, Georgia. He was noticed playing baseball, and was asked to join the camp baseball team. He was promoted to second lieutenant after eight months, and assigned to officers' training school. His high batting average "spared him a trip across the ocean to the front lines." The team manager at the camp was Charles Frank, who in peacetime owned and managed the Atlanta Crackers of the Class AA Southern Association. After World War I ended in November, 1918, but before Lausche was discharged in January, 1919, Frank offered Lausche a six-month contract, at $225 per month if he would report at spring training. Lausche had also completed high school while in the Army.

Legal career

Lausche entered the Cleveland-Marshall School of Law early on 1919, and decided to continue in law school that spring, rather than report to spring training. He graduated from the law school in 1921. He was ranked second in his class at John Marshall School of Law and quickly became known as one of Cleveland's better trial lawyers. Lausche served as Municipal Court judge from 1932 to 1937 and Common Pleas Court judge from 1937 to 1941, before winning election as Mayor of Cleveland in 1941.

Mayor and governor

He served until 1944, when he first won election as governor of Ohio, the state's first Catholic in that position. Lausche served as governor from 1945 to 1947, when he narrowly lost to Thomas J. Herbert. Lausche defeated Herbert in a 1948 rematch, however, and served four consecutive two-year terms from 1949 to 1957. He was reelected as governor in 1950, defeating state Treasurer Don H. Ebright; in 1952, defeating Cincinnati Mayor Charles Phelps Taft II; and in 1954, defeating state Auditor Jim Rhodes, who later became governor himself. Lausche resigned in early 1957, having won election to the United States Senate in November 1956, unseating incumbent Republican George Bender.

U.S. Senator
In his first term, with the Senate almost evenly split, Lausche gave Senate Democratic leader Lyndon B. Johnson a scare by hinting that he might vote for Republican William F. Knowland for Senate Majority Leader, although he ultimately did not. Throughout his career, Lausche displayed a bipartisan and independent approach to politics, being known by some as a "Democrat with a small 'd'", but his approach to ethnic Democratic politics paved the way for followers such as Ralph S. Locher, who became Mayor of Cleveland and later an associate justice of the Ohio Supreme Court, and Bronis Klementowicz, a leader of Cleveland City Council and law director under Locher. Lausche's independence also earned him, among some, the derisive moniker, "Frank the Fence."  Lausche was easily re-elected to the Senate in 1962, but was defeated in his bid for renomination in 1968, due to his loss of labor union support. He lost the Democratic primary against John J. Gilligan by a 55% to 45% margin, and in the general election, Lausche refused to support Gilligan, who went on to lose the general election to then-state Attorney General William B. Saxbe.

Lausche was a very popular, plain-spoken, big-city politician of the old school. He was credited with building a coalition of ethnic voters in Cleveland known as the "cosmopolitan Democrats." There is some evidence that Republican presidential candidate Dwight D. Eisenhower in 1952 considered asking Lausche to become his running mate and is said to have been considered in the Republican 1956 campaign by Leonard W. Hall in a presidential meeting.

Retirement and death
In retirement, Lausche and his wife lived in Bethesda, Maryland. Jane Lausche died November 24, 1981, and, having converted to the Roman Catholic faith, was buried at Calvary Cemetery in southeast Cleveland. Lausche continued to live in Bethesda until contracting pneumonia in January 1990. He was flown back to Cleveland, and was admitted to the Slovenian Home for the Aged on February 20, where he died of congestive heart failure April 21, 1990.

Lausche's funeral was at St. Vitus Church, with Bishop Anthony Edward Pevec delivering the homily. He was buried at Calvary Cemetery. His tombstone was incorrectly inscribed with a birth date of 1898.

Honours and legacy
Lausche was named a Knight of St John of Malta by Pope John Paul II, "the highest civilian honor that can be bestowed by the Catholic Church".

The State of Ohio's office building in Cleveland Ohio is named after Lausche, as is the Lausche Building at the Ohio Expo Center (site of the Ohio State Fair). In 2005, James E. Odenkirk authored the book Frank J. Lausche: Ohio's Great Political Maverick, an in-depth look at Lausche's political career. In the early 1990s, Ohio's Lincoln was published.

Lausche Avenue (formerly Glass Avenue), a street that spans between East 60th and East 64th Streets adjacent St. Vitus church in the St. Clair-Superior neighborhood on Cleveland's East Side, is named for Lausche, whose family were members of the parish as well as residents of the neighborhood.

A bust of Lausche is displayed at St. Mary of the Assumption Church in Cleveland's Collinwood neighborhood, and an exhibit of Lausche artifacts is displayed at Cleveland's Slovenian Museum and Archives.

See also

Election Results, Ohio Governor
Election Results, Ohio Governor (Democratic Primaries)

References

External links

1895 births
1990 deaths
20th-century American politicians
American people of German descent
American people of Slovenian descent
American Roman Catholics
Burials in Calvary Cemetery (Cleveland)
Democratic Party governors of Ohio
Democratic Party United States senators from Ohio
Duluth Dukes players
Knights of Malta
Lawrence Barristers players
Mayors of Cleveland
Slovene-American culture in Cleveland
United States Army soldiers
Candidates in the 1956 United States presidential election